William John Hughes Butterfield, Baron Butterfield,  (28 March 1920 – 22 July 2000) was a leading British medical researcher, clinician and administrator.

Early life and education
Butterfield was educated at Solihull School, an historic independent school in the West Midlands. Whilst at Solihull he was Head Boy, Head of CCF and captain of rugby, cricket, hockey and athletics. He continued his sporting passions while studying at Oxford, becoming a triple blue. He then benefited from a two-year Rockefeller Foundation Scholar grant to study at Johns Hopkins University, where he gained a further medical degree.

Career
After his degree, national military service awaited him. He spent it as an officer in the Army Physiological Unit and Deputy Director for Scientific Research. He subsequently returned to the United States, to a fellowship at the Medical College of Virginia at Richmond.

Over the years he was appointed to many commissions in the United Kingdom and elsewhere. Among his professional research interests was diabetes mellitus. His appointments included one as Professor of Experimental Medicine at Guy's Hospital. In 1970 he was invited to accept the position of Vice-Chancellor of the University of Nottingham.

In 1976 he was appointed Regius Professor of Physic at the University of Cambridge where he led the re-establishment of the School of Clinical Medicine, University of Cambridge. In 1978 on the death of Sir Morien Morgan he was elected Master of Downing College, Cambridge, where he was a popular figure. Even after retirement from the post, his links with his adopted College persisted and he did what he could to further its interests. The College bar at Downing is named after him. The Mastership of Downing led to a term also as Vice-Chancellor of the University of Cambridge.

Honours
Butterfield was appointed Officer of the Order of the British Empire (OBE) in 1953. In 1978, he was knighted. He was made a life peer in 1988 as Baron Butterfield, of Stechford in the County of West Midlands.

Footnotes

References 
Payne, M.A., 'Presentation of Honorary Fellowship to Professor Sir John Butterfield', in Bulletin of the New York Academy of Medicine vol. 53, n. 10 (December 1987) 907-908

BUTTERFIELD, Baron, Who Was Who, A & C Black, 1920–2008; online edn, Oxford University Press, Dec 2012

 
 

 

1920 births
2000 deaths
Conservative Party (UK) life peers
Academics of King's College London
Officers of the Order of the British Empire
Vice-Chancellors of the University of Nottingham
Fellows of Downing College, Cambridge
Regius Professors of Physic (Cambridge)
Vice-Chancellors of the University of Cambridge
Alumni of Exeter College, Oxford
Johns Hopkins University alumni
Masters of Downing College, Cambridge
Knights Bachelor
Physicians of Guy's Hospital
British expatriates in the United States
Life peers created by Elizabeth II